Nasir Colony is a neighbourhood in the Korangi District in eastern Karachi, Pakistan. It was previously part of Korangi Town, which was an administrative unit that was disbanded in 2011.

There are several ethnic groups in Nasir Colony including Muhajirs, Punjabis, Sindhis, Kashmiris, Seraikis, Pakhtuns, Balochis, Memons, Christians, Bohras and Ismailis.

Nasir Colony has two large mosques, one church, and one football pitch. Its football club's name is Nasir Sports Football Club.

References

Nasir Colony adjacent to Korangi No.1, Karachi is a heavily populated area having multiple languages, religions.

External links 
 Karachi website.

Neighbourhoods of Karachi
Korangi Town